The Play-offs of the 2012 Fed Cup Europe/Africa Zone Group I were the final stages of the Group I Zonal Competition involving teams from Europe and Africa. Using the positions determined in their pools, the fifteen teams faced off to determine their placing in the 2012 Fed Cup Europe/Africa Zone Group I. The top two teams advanced to World Group II play-offs, and the bottom two teams were relegated down to the Europe/Africa Zone Group II.

Promotion play-offs
The first placed teams of each pool were drawn in head-to-head rounds. The winner of each round advanced to the World Group II play-offs.

Austria vs. Great Britain

Sweden vs. Poland

5th to 8th play-offs
The second placed teams of each pool were drawn in head-to-head rounds to find the equal fifth and seventh placed teams.

Bulgaria vs. Portugal

Hungary vs. Romania

9th to 12th play-offs
The third placed teams of each pool except Pool A were drawn in head-to-head rounds to find the equal ninth and the eleventh placed teams.

Bosnia and Herzegovina vs. Croatia

Relegation play-offs
The last placed teams of each pool were drawn in head-to-head rounds. The loser of each round was relegated down to Europe/Africa Zone Group II in 2013.

Estonia vs. Netherlands

Greece vs. Luxembourg

Final Placements

  and  advanced to the World Group II play-offs, where they were drawn against each other for advancement.  defeated , 4–1, and thus proceeded to World Group II whilst the British were relegated back to Group I for 2013.

See also
Fed Cup structure

References

External links
 Fed Cup website

2012 Fed Cup Europe/Africa Zone